This is a list of notable events in music that took place in 1553.

Events 
none listed

Publications 
Francesco Bendusi –  for four (Venice: Antonio Gardano), a collection of dance music
Baldassare Donato – First book of madrigals for five and six voices (Venice: Antonio Gardano)
Jhan Gero – 40 Madrigals for three voices (Venice: Antonio Gardano)
Jacquet of Mantua – Motets for five voices (Venice: Antonio Gardano)
Vicente Lusitano –  (Rome)
Guillaume de Morlaye
first collection for lute
Second book of guitar tablature (Paris: Michel Fezendat)
Diego Ortiz
, 10 December, Rome (Spanish edition)
, 10 December, Rome (Italian edition of Trattado de glossas)

Classical music

Births 
October 18? – Luca Marenzio (c.1553), Italian composer (died 1599)
date unknown – Johannes Eccard, German composer and kapellmeister (died 1611)
probable – Leonhard Lechner, German composer (died 1606)

Deaths 
February 4 – Caspar Othmayr, German Protestant pastor, theologian and composer (born 1515)
October 7 – Cristóbal de Morales, Spanish composer (born 1500)
date unknown
Mateo Flecha, Catalan composer (born 1481)
Mattio Rampollini, Italian composer (born 1497)

 
Music
16th century in music
Music by year